Ronald George Russell (born 1957) is a Utah attorney in private practice and is a former nominee to be a United States district judge of the United States District Court for the District of Utah. He has 4 children and resides in Centerville UT.

Biography

Russell received a Bachelor of Arts degree in 1980 from Weber State College. He received a Juris Doctor in 1983 from the S.J. Quinney College of Law at the University of Utah, graduating Order of the Coif. He has spent almost his entire legal career at the Salt Lake City law firm of Parr, Brown, Gee & Loveless, joining as an associate in 1983 and being elevated to partner in 1988. He specializes in commercial litigation and real estate law. In 1984, he served as a law clerk to Judge David K. Winder of the United States District Court for the District of Utah. Concurrent with his private practice of law, he has served twelve years as a part-time elected official in local government, including one four-year term as a council member on the Centerville City Council, from 1998 to 2001, as well as two consecutive terms as Mayor of Centerville, from 2006 to 2013.

Expired nomination to district court

On December 16, 2015, President Obama nominated Russell to serve as a United States District Judge of the United States District Court for the District of Utah, to the seat vacated by Judge Ted Stewart, who took senior status on September 1, 2014. He received a hearing before the United States Senate Judiciary Committee on April 20, 2016. On May 19, 2016, his nomination was reported out of committee by voice vote. His nomination expired on January 3, 2017, with the end of the 114th Congress.

References

1957 births
Living people
People from Ogden, Utah
S.J. Quinney College of Law alumni
Utah lawyers
Weber State University alumni
People from Centerville, Utah